Dositheus (Dōsítheos) is a Greek masculine given name, and it may refer to:

 Dositheos (Samaritan) (fl. 1st century), Gnostic
 Dositheus Magister (fl. 4th century), Roman grammarian and jurist
 Dositheus of Constantinople (died after 1191), or Dositheus I of Jerusalem, Greek Orthodox Patriarch
 Dositheos II of Jerusalem (1641–1707), Greek Orthodox Patriarch of Jerusalem 1669–1707
 Dositheus of Tbilisi (died 1795), Georgian Orthodox archbishop
 Dositheus (Ivanchenko) (1884–1984), bishop of the Russian Orthodox Church, bishop of Brooklyn
 Dositej Obradović, Serbian monk, author, and educator.
 Dositej Vasić, metropolitan of Serbian Orthodox Church.
 Dositej II, Archbishop of Ohrid and Macedonia.

Greek-language names